Henry Calder (1858–1938) was an English cricketer.

Henry Calder may also refer to:
Henry Calder (Australian cricketer) (1906–1970)
Sir Henry Calder, 4th Baronet (1774–1792), of the Calder baronets
Sir Henry Calder, 5th Baronet (1792–1868), of the Calder baronets

See also
Harry Calder (1901–1995), cricketer
Calder (disambiguation)